Scrofuloderma is a skin condition caused by tuberculous involvement of the skin by direct extension, usually from underlying tuberculous lymphadenitis.

See also 
 Scrofula
 Skin lesion
 List of cutaneous conditions
 Tuberculosis

References

External links
 

Mycobacterium-related cutaneous conditions